The 2002 Stockholm municipal election was held on Sunday, 15 September 2002.  The election used a party-list proportional representation system to allocate the 101-seats of the Stockholm City Council (Stockholms stadsfullmäktige) to the various Swedish political parties.  This election was held concurrently with the 2002 Swedish parliamentary election. Voter turnout was 77.7%.

This election marks the first time since the election of 1976 that the Stockholm Party failed to win any seats, ending their 23-year streak of representation on the City Council.

Results

See also 
Elections in Sweden
Swedish Election Authority
Politics of Sweden
List of political parties in Sweden

References
Statistics Sweden, "Kommunfullmäktigval – valresultat" (Swedish) 
Statistics Sweden, "Kommunfullmäktigval – erhållna mandat efter kommun och parti. Valår 1973–2006" (Swedish) 
Swedish Election Authority (Valmyndigheten) "Kommunfullmäktigval i Stockholm" 

Municipal elections in Stockholm
Stockholm municipal election
Municipal election, 2002
Government of Stockholm
Stockholm municipal election